Peter Zaťko (born  in Topoľčany, Slovakia) is a Slovak wheelchair curler.

He participated at the 2018 Winter Paralympics where Slovak team finished on ninth place.

Wheelchair curling teams and events

References

External links 

Peter Zaťko | Slovenský paralympijský výbor
 
 Video: 

Living people
1983 births
Sportspeople from Topoľčany
Slovak male curlers
Slovak wheelchair curlers
Paralympic wheelchair curlers of Slovakia
Wheelchair curlers at the 2018 Winter Paralympics
Wheelchair curlers at the 2022 Winter Paralympics